Kelly L. Kirchbaum (born June 14, 1957) is a former American football linebacker who played two seasons in the National Football League (NFL) with the Kansas City Chiefs and Philadelphia Eagles. He was drafted by the New York Jets in the fifth round of the 1979  NFL Draft. He played college football at the University of Kentucky and attended North Hardin High School in Radcliff, Kentucky. Kirchbaum was also a member of the Tampa Bay Bandits and Denver Dynamite. He was a member of the Denver Dynamite team that won ArenaBowl I.

References

External links
Just Sports Stats
College stats
Fanbase profile

Living people
1957 births
Players of American football from Kentucky
American football linebackers
Kentucky Wildcats football players
Kansas City Chiefs players
Tampa Bay Bandits players
Denver Dynamite (arena football) players
Philadelphia Eagles players
People from Radcliff, Kentucky
National Football League replacement players